Peter Anthony Grayson Rawlinson, Baron Rawlinson of Ewell,  (26 June 1919 – 28 June 2006) was an English barrister, Conservative politician and author. He served as Member of Parliament for Epsom for 23 years, from 1955 to 1978, and held the offices of Solicitor General (1962–1964) and Attorney General for England and Wales (1970–1974) and for Northern Ireland (1972–1974). Had he been appointed Lord Chancellor, as seemed likely during the mid-1970s, he would have been the first Roman Catholic to hold that position since Thomas More in 1532.

Early life
Rawlinson was born in Iping, West Sussex or Birkenhead, Cheshire. on 26 June 1919. He was the son of Lieutenant-Colonel A. R. Rawlinson OBE, a figure in military intelligence and a screenwriter. He was educated by Benedictine monks at Downside, near Bath, Somerset. He read Law at Christ's College, Cambridge, where he joined the Cambridge Footlights. He was later elected as an Honorary Fellow of his college in 1981.

However, he only completed one year at the university, moving on to the Royal Military College, Sandhurst, on the outbreak of the Second World War in 1939. He joined the Irish Guards in 1940. In 1943, he was wounded in battle while serving in North Africa and mentioned in dispatches. He was demobilized as a Major in 1946.

Legal career
Rawlinson was called to the bar at Inner Temple in 1946, just before he left the Army. He later became a Bencher in 1962 and was Treasurer in 1984. He joined the chambers of Walter Monckton. The first of his cases that came to public attention was that of Alfred Charles Whiteway, in the Towpath murder case in 1953, in which he was junior counsel.  He subjected the leading police murder squad detective, Herbert Hannam, to a searching cross-examination over 2 days, which exposed substantial gaps in Hannam's account of a confession by Whiteway. Whiteway was convicted and hanged, but Rawlinson was instructed in other well-known cases.

He was also a junior counsel in the unsuccessful defence of Peter Wildeblood, tried with Edward Montagu and Michael Pitt-Rivers for gross indecency in 1954. A year later in 1955, he was junior counsel for Melford Stevenson in the defence of Ruth Ellis, who was hanged. He also acted in defence of General Anders in a libel case. He took silk in 1959. He was Recorder of Salisbury from 1961 to 1962, and Recorder of Kingston upon Thames from 1975 to 2002. He was Leader of the Western Circuit from 1975 to 1982. In 1965, he defended the Daily Express in an action relating to D-Notices.

Political career
A member of the Conservative Party, he stood as a Parliamentary candidate for Hackney South in the 1951 general election, losing in a landslide to the Labour incumbent, Herbert Butler. He was elected in the 1955 general election for the safe Conservative seat of Epsom, and held the seat until it was abolished at the February 1974 general election. He was re-elected for the new Epsom and Ewell seat, which he held until his ennoblement in 1978.

He was appointed Solicitor-General by Harold Macmillan in June 1962, following the Night of the Long Knives, receiving the customary knighthood, and served through the prosecution of the spy John Vassall (and subsequent resignation of a junior minister, Tam Galbraith) and the Profumo affair, in which his offer to resign was declined.

He was sworn of the Privy Council in the 1964 New Year Honours, and remained on the front benches in opposition, after the government lost the 1964 general election, but returned to the back benches after unsuccessfully supporting Reginald Maudling as new party leader. From the back benches, he led the opposition to the abolition of the death penalty. He served as Attorney General during the government of Edward Heath, from 1970 to 1974. Unusually, he conducted many prosecutions in person, including that of the Hosein brothers for kidnapping and murdering Muriel McKay (whom they had mistaken for Rupert Murdoch's wife).

He appeared before the House of Lords, arguing that The Times was in contempt of court in publishing details of the cases involving thalidomide, which drew the ire, in particular, of Bernard Levin, who wrote that he appeared to want the law to be administered in private. He also prosecuted IRA members for bombings in London and Aldershot. In 1972, when the Stormont Parliament was suspended, he also became Attorney General for Northern Ireland, and so was called to the bar and became a QC in Northern Ireland that year. He was a target of the Angry Brigade, which attempted to bomb his house several times.

Retirement 
He retired from the House of Commons in 1978, and was created a life peer on 17 April 1978 as Baron Rawlinson of Ewell, of Ewell in the County of Surrey. He harboured hopes of being appointed Lord Chancellor or Lord Chief Justice (the law having been changed in 1974 to permit a Roman Catholic to take the former position, widely seen at the time as a measure to permit Rawlinson to take the job) but his politics diverged from those of the new Conservative leader, Margaret Thatcher, and he was never offered either position. In the Lords, he supported restrictions on abortion and divorce, and resisted the introduction of conditional fees in legal cases.

After retiring he defended the Daily Mail in a libel action brought by the Unification Church in 1980, and retired from practice at the bar in 1985, but was President of the Senate of Inns of Court and the Bar from 1986 to 1987. He was also an Honorary Member of the American Bar Association, and an Honorary Fellow of the American College Trial Lawyers.

Other interests
He was also an author, having published a book of poetry in 1943, his autobiography in 1989, books on themes inspired by his Catholic faith, and several novels on legal themes; one, Hatred and Contempt, won the Rumpole Award. He also enjoyed landscape painting and the theatre.

He was a member of White's and the Marylebone Cricket Club, the vice-president of the Royal Automobile Club, and president of the Friends of London Oratory from 1980 to 1995. He was also a director of Daily Telegraph plc.

Family
He was married twice:
 Haidee Kavanagh (1940–1954) (three daughters); (marriage dissolved and annulled by Sacred Rota, Rome 1954)
 Elaine Dominguez (1954–2006) (two sons and one daughter)

His second wife was his first cousin, their mothers being daughters of Sir Henry Grayson.

Arms

Publications
 War Poems and Poetry 1943
 Public Duty and Personal Faith - the example of Thomas More 1978
 A Price Too High (autobiography) 1989
 The Jesuit Factor 1990
 The Colombia Syndicate (novel) 1991
 Hatred and Contempt (novel) 1992
 His Brother's Keeper (novel) 1993
 Indictment for Murder (novel) 1994
 The Caverel Claim (novel) 1998
 The Richmond Diary (novel) 2001
 A Relic of War (novel) 2004

References
Burke's Peerage, Debrett's Peerage, Who's Who
Obituary, The Daily Telegraph, 29 June 2006
Obituary, The Guardian, 30 June 2006
Obituary, The Independent, 30 June 2006
Obituary, The Times, 30 June 2006

External links 
 
The Papers of Peter Rawlinson held at Churchill Archives Centre

1919 births
2006 deaths
English barristers
Irish Guards officers
British Army personnel of World War II
English King's Counsel
20th-century King's Counsel
Members of the Inner Temple
Conservative Party (UK) MPs for English constituencies
English writers
Epsom and Ewell
Rawlinson of Ewell
Members of the Privy Council of the United Kingdom
English Roman Catholics
Graduates of the Royal Military College, Sandhurst
People educated at Downside School
Alumni of Christ's College, Cambridge
Fellows of Christ's College, Cambridge
UK MPs 1955–1959
UK MPs 1959–1964
UK MPs 1964–1966
UK MPs 1966–1970
UK MPs 1970–1974
UK MPs 1974
UK MPs 1974–1979
UK MPs who were granted peerages
Solicitors General for England and Wales
Attorneys General for England and Wales
Attorneys General for Northern Ireland
Northern Ireland Government ministers
Politicians awarded knighthoods
Ministers in the Macmillan and Douglas-Home governments, 1957–1964
20th-century English lawyers
20th-century English male writers
Life peers created by Elizabeth II